Mississippi elected its member August 2–3, 1824.

See also 
 1824 and 1825 United States House of Representatives elections
 List of United States representatives from Mississippi

1824
Mississippi
United States House of Representatives